Ukrainian literature is literature written in the Ukrainian language.

Ukrainian literature mostly developed under foreign domination over Ukrainian territories, foreign rule by the Polish–Lithuanian Commonwealth, Poland, the Russian Empire, the Kingdom of Romania, the Austria-Hungary Empire, and the Ottoman Empire, enriched Ukrainian culture and language, and Ukrainian authors were able to produce a rich literary heritage.

Ukrainian literature’s precursor: writings in Old-Church Slavonic and Latin in Ukraine 
Prior to the establishment of Ukrainian literature in 1700s, many authors from Ukraine wrote in "scholarly" languages of middle-ages – Latin and Old-Church Slavonic. Among prominent authors from Ukraine who wrote in Latin and Old-Church Slavonic are Hryhorii Skovoroda, Yuriy Drohobych, Stanislav Orikhovsky-Roxolan, Feofan Prokopovych,  and others.

The beginnings of oral Ukrainian literature 

During this period of history there was a higher number of elementary schools per population in the Hetmanate than in either neighboring Muscovy or Poland.  In the 1740s, of 1,099 settlements within seven regimental districts, as many as 866 had primary schools. The German visitor to the Hetmanate, writing in 1720, commented on how the son of Hetman Danylo Apostol, who had never left Ukraine, was fluent in the Latin, Italian, French, German, Polish and Russian languages

Late 16th and early 17th century included the rise of folk epics called dumy. These songs celebrated the activities of the Cossacks and were oral retellings of major Ukrainian historical events in modern Ukrainian language (i.e., not in Old-Church Slavonic). This period produced Ostap Veresai, a renowned minstrel and kobzar from Poltava province, Ukraine.

The beginnings of written Ukrainian literature 

The establishment of Ukrainian literature is believed to have been triggered by the publishing of a widely successful poem Eneida by Ivan Kotliarevsky in 1798, which is one of the first instances of a printed literary work written in modern Ukrainian language. Due to Kotliarevsky's role as the inaugurator of Ukrainian literature, among literary critics he is often referred to as "the father of Ukrainian literature". Modern Ukrainian prose was inaugurated by Hryhorii Kvitka-Osnovianenko’s novel Marusya (1834).

Iryna Vilde 

Ukrainian writer Iryna Vilde (pseudonym of Daryna Dmytrivna Makohon) was born on 5 May 1907 in Czernowitz (Chernivtsi), Austro-Hungarian monarchy and died on 30 October 1982 in Lviv. Her father was Dmytro Makohon, a lecturer and writer on folk arts. She graduated from Lviv University in 1932. She was married to Eugene Polotnyuk.

From 1930 to 1939 she published short stories and novels about the life of Western Ukrainian intelligentsia, the petty bourgeoisie and students. In 1935 she, for the first time under the pseudonym "Iryna Vilde" published the novel "The Butterflies in high heels" (Ukrainian "Meteliki na shpilkah").

After the reunification of Western Ukraine with Ukrainian SSR, she continued to describe the familiar themes of family in bourgeois society. She is the author of many short stories, novellas and novels. Her work contain a huge number of characters – protagonists from all public layers of the then Galicia – of the clergy, employees, workers, peasants, petty bourgeoisie, as well as information on the activities of various parties and public organizations, the Polish administration policy, the economy, education and the culture.

Some of her work are: The collection of short stories "Bizarre Heart" (1936), the story "Adult Children" (1939), a collection of lyrical miniatures "Okrushyny" (1969), the trilogy "Butterflies heels" (2007), novels "Adult Children" (1952), "Sisters Richynski" (Book 1 – 1958 book 2 – 1964), the trilogy "Butterflies on hairpins" (2007). "Sisters Richynski" is considered to be her most creative achievement.

Contemporary literature 

Since the late 1980s, and particularly after the independence of Ukraine (1991) and disappearance of Soviet censorship the whole generation of writers emerged: Sofia Maidanska, Ihor Kalynets, Moysey Fishbein, Yuri Andrukhovych, Serhiy Zhadan, Oksana Zabuzhko, Oleksandr Irvanets, Yuriy Izdryk, Maria Matios, Ihor Pavlyuk and many others. Many of them are considered to be "postmodernists".

At the same time the post-neoclassical literary trend has grown where the main figures are Igor Kaczurowskyj (d. 2013) and Maksym Strikha.

List of notable Ukrainian writers 
Ukrainian notable writers include (alphabetically):

Emma Andijewska
Yuri Andrukhovych
Borys Antonenko-Davydovych
Bohdan-Ihor Antonych
Ivan Bahrianyi
Mykola Bazhan
Vasyl Barka
Bohdan Boychuk
Stepan Charnetskyi
Ilarion Cholhan
Viktor Domontovych
Ivan Drach
Ivan Franko
Moysey Fishbein
Eliáš Galajda
Nikolai Gogol
Yaroslav Halan
Oles Honchar
Yevhen Hutsalo
Ihor Kaczurowskyj
Ihor Kalynets
Iryna Kalynets
Tadey Karabovych/Karabowicz
Yelysei Karpenko
Lesia Khraplyva
Mykola Khvylovy
Natalia Kobrynska
Olha Kobylyanska
Ivan Kocherha
Oleksa Kolomiyets
Yuriy Kosach
Lina Kostenko
Eaghor (Ihor) Kostetzky
Ivan Kotlyarevsky
Mykhailo Kotsiubynsky
Ludmyla Kovalenko
Oleh Koverko
Mykola Kulish
Panteleimon Kulish
Ivan Kulyk
Myroslav Laiuk
Oksana Lutsyshyna
Yuriy Lypa
Andriy Lyubka
Oleh Lysheha
Sofia Maidanska
Vasyl Makhno
Andriy Malyshko
Tanya Malyarchuk
Maria Matios
Leonid Mosendz
Panas Myrny
Ivan Nechuy-Levytsky
Oleksandr Oles
Joseph Oleskiw
Ihor Pavlyuk
Olena Pchilka
Valerian Pidmohylny
Les Podervianskyi
Svitlana Pyrkalo
Maksym Rylsky
Taras Shevchenko
Valeriy Shevchuk
Vasyl Shkliar
Hryhori Skovoroda
Maryna Sokolyan
Volodymyr Sosyura
Vasyl Stefanyk
Vasyl Stus
Vasyl Symonenko
Yuriy Tarnawsky
Olena Teliha
Hryhir Tiutiunnyk
Pavlo Tychyna
Yuriy Tys
Lesya Ukrainka
Oles Ulianenko
Iryna Vilde
Marko Vovchok
Volodymyr Vynnychenko
Yuriy Vynnychuk
Ostap Vyshnia
Vira Vovk
Yuriy Yanovsky
Oksana Zabuzhko
Pavlo Zahrebelnyi
Mykola Zerov
Serhiy Zhadan

See also 
 The Forest Song
 History of Ukrainian literature
 List of Ukrainian-language writers
 Shevchenko National Prize – the national literary and artistic award
 Ukrainian Book Institute
 Ukrainian studies
 Belarusian literature

References

Bibliography 
 Ukrainian Literature at the END of the millennium. Preview By: Chernetsky, Vitaly. World Literature Today, Spring2002
 Iryna Drobot. Vasyl' Stefanyk's Short Stories: The Narrative Modernization Problem.
 The Interdependence of Literature – Webster's Ukrainian. Thesaurus Edition by Georgina Pell Curtis (Kindle Edition – 23 July 2008)
 For a Crust of Bread (Women's Voices in Ukrainian Literature, Vol. VI) by Nataliya Kobrynska and Roma Franko (25 October 2000)
 Ukrainian Literature in the Twentieth Century: A Reader's Guide by George S. N. Luckyj (Mar 1992)
 Anamorphosic Texts and Reconfigured Visions: Improvised Traditions in Contemporary Ukrainian and Irish Literature (Soviet and Post-Soviet Politics and Society 62) by Maryna Romanets and Andreas Umland (Paperback – 2 October 2007)
 But... The Lord Is Silent: Selected prose fiction by Olha Kobylianska and Yevheniya Yaroshynska (Women's Voices in Ukrainian Literature Vol. III) by Roma Franko (10 September 1999)
 From Heart to Heart: Selected prose fiction by Hrytsko Hryhorenko and Lesya Ukrainka (Women's Voices in Ukrainian Literature Vol. IV) by Hrytsko Hryhorenko (Paperback – 15 November 1999)
 The Life of Paisij Velyckovs'kyj (Harvard Library of Early Ukrainian Literature: Translations) by Anthony-Emil Tachiaos and J. M. E. Featherstone (Hardcover – 15 August 1990)
 Treasury of Ukrainian Love: Poems, Quotations & Proverbs in Ukrainian and English by Helene Turkewicz-Sanko (Kindle Edition – 30 April 1997) – Kindle Book
 The Hagiography of Kievan Rus (Harvard Library of Early Ukrainian Literature: Translations) by Paul Hollingsworth (Paperback – 10 December 1992)
 The Paterik of the Kievan Caves Monastery (Harvard Library of Early Ukrainian Literature: Translations) by Muriel Heppell (Hardcover – 22 June 1989)
 A History of Ukrainian Literature (From the 11th to the End of the 19th Century): With an Overview of the Twentieth Century (Annals of the Ukrainian Academy … and Sciences in the U.S., Inc, Vol 17–19) by Dmitrij Tschizewskij, George S. N. Luckyj, Dolly Ferguson, and Doreen Gorsline (Hardcover – May 1997)
 The Anti-Imperial Choice: The Making of the Ukrainian Jew by Yohanan Petrovsky-Shtern (Kindle Edition – 28 April 2009)
 Hryjorij Hrabjanka's the Great War of Bohdan Xmel'nyc'kyj (Harvard Library of Early Ukrainian Literature:, Vol. 9) by Hryhorij Hrabjanka (1991)
 Canuke Literature: Critical Essays on Canadian Ukrainian Writing. (Book Review): An article from: Canadian Ethnic Studies Journal by George Melnyk (Digital – 31 July 2005) – HTML
 Edificatory Prose of Kievan Rus (Harvard Library of Early Ukrainian Literature: Translations) by Kievan Rus, William R. Veder, and Anatolij A. Turilov (Hardcover – Sep 1994)
 Ukrainian Literature Through the Ages by Yevhen Shabliovsky (1 January 1970) Mistetstvo Publishers (Kiev), 1970, ncrd, (1 January 1970)
 Ukrainian Literature Through the Ages by Yevhen Shabliovsky, Abraham Mistetsky, and Andrew Marko (Paperback – 1 January 2001)
 Ukrainian Literature: Studies of the Leading Authors (Essay index reprint series) by Clarence A. Manning (Hardcover – Dec 1977)
 Ukrainian literature at the end of the millennium: the ten best works of the 1990s. (Currents).: An article from: World Literature Today by Vitaly Chernetsky (Digital – 30 July 2005)
 Bibliography of Ukrainian Literature in English and French: Translations and Critical Works (University of Ottawa Ukrainian Studies) by Oksana Piaseckyj (Paperback – Nov 1989)
 Russian and Ukrainian Literature on the Gypsy Moth: An Annotated Bibliography, by Yuri N. & Nikitenko, Galina N. & Montgomery, Michael E. Baranchikov (Paperback – 1 January 1998)
 The Old Rus' Kievan and Galician-Volhynian Chronicles: The Ostroz'kyj (Xlebnikov) and Cetvertyns'kyj (Pogodin) Codices (Harvard Library of Early Ukrainian Literature: Texts) by Omeljan Pritsak (Hardcover – Feb 1991)
 Sermons and Rhetoric of Kievan Rus (Harvard Library of Early Ukrainian Literature: Translations) by Simon Franklin (Hardcover – 1 April 1991)
 Becoming the hyphen: the evolution of English-language Ukrainian-Canadian literature.: An article from: Canadian Ethnic Studies Journal by Lindy Ledohowski (Digital – 9 December 2008)
 Russian and Ukrainian Literature on the Gypsy Moth: An Annotated Bibliography by Yuri N. & Nikitenko, Galina N. & Montgomery, Michael E. Baranchikov (Paperback – 1 January 1998)
 Development of Ukrainian Literature in Czechoslovakia, 1945–1975 (European University Studies) by Josef Sirka (Paperback – Dec 1978) Peter Lang AG (December 1978)
 Vitaly Chernetsky, Mapping Postcommunist Cultures: Russia and Ukraine in the Context of Globalization (McGill-Queen's University Press, 2007)
 Catherine Wanner, Communities of the Converted: Ukrainians and Global Evangelism (Cornell University Press, 2007).
 Alexandra Hrycak, “Foundation Feminism and the Articulation of Hybrid Feminisms in Post-Socialist Ukraine,” East European Politics and Societies 20.1 (2006): 69–100
 Natan M. Meir, “Jews, Ukrainians, and Russians in Kiev: Intergroup Relations in Late Imperial Associational Life,” Slavic Review 65.3 (2006): 475–501
 Karel C. Berkhoff. The 'Russian' Prisoners of War in Nazi-Ruled Ukraine as Victims of Genocidal Massacre" (in Holocaust and Genocide Studies, vol. 15, nr. 1, 2001)
 Karel C. Berkhoff. "Ukraine under Nazi Rule (1941–1944): Sources and Finding Aids" (in Jahrbücher für Geschichte Osteuropas, vol. 45, nr. 1 en nr. 2, 1997)
 3Karel C. Berkhoff. Despair: Life and Death in Ukraine under Nazi Rule. (Harvard University Press Harvest, 2004)
 Canuke Literature: Critical Essays on Ukrainian Writing by Sonia Mycak (Hardcover – Feb 2001)
 Rus Restored: Selected Writings of Meletij Smotryckyj (1610–1630) (Harvard Library of Early Ukrainian Literature: Translations) by Meletij Smotryckyj and David Frick (Hardcover – 31 March 2006)
 Ukrainian Literature Through The Ages by Yevhen (Translated By Abraham Mistetsky, Andrew Marko, Anatole Bilenko, & John Weir) Shabliovsky (Hardcover – 1 January 1970)
 From Heart to Heart: Selected prose fiction by Hrytsko Hryhorenko and Lesya Ukrainka (Women's Voices in Ukrainian Literature Vol. IV) by Hrytsko Hryhorenko (Paperback – 15 November 1999)
 The Life of Paisij Velyckovs'kyj (Harvard Library of Early Ukrainian Literature: Translations) by Anthony-Emil Tachiaos and J. M. E. Featherstone (Hardcover – 15 August 1990)
 Shakespeare in the Undiscovered Bourn: Les Kurbas, Ukrainian Modernism, and Early Soviet Cultural Politics. University of Toronto Press (20 April 2004)
 Irena R. Makaryk is a professor in the Department of English at the University of Ottawa.
 Ukrainian Modernism, 1910–1930 Museum; Foundation (2006)
 The New Generation and Artistic Modernism in the Ukraine (Studies in the Fine Arts Avant-Garde) Umi Research Pr (October 1986)
 Ukraine and Its Western Neighbors conference proceedings (December 2000).  Author: James Clem and Nancy Popson, eds., James Clem, Executive Director, Ukrainian Research Institute, Harvard University; Nancy Popson, Deputy Director, Kennan Institute.
 Borderland: A Journey through the History of Ukraine by Anna Reid (Paperback – 1 June 2000)
 Russia and Ukraine: Literature and the Discourse of Empire from Napoleonic to Postcolonial Times by Myroslav Shkandrij (Hardcover – Dec 2001)
 The slaughter of the Jews in the Ukraine in 1919 by Elias Heifetz (Unknown Binding – 1921)
 Myroslav Shkandrij. Russia and Ukraine: Literature and the Discourse of Empire from Napoleonic to Postcolonial Times.(Book Review): An article from: World Literature Today by Tatiana Nazarenko (Digital – 31 July 2005)
 Ukrainian literature at the end of the millennium: the ten best works of the 1990s. (Currents).: An article from: World Literature Today by Vitaly Chernetsky (Digital – 30 July 2005)
 Promoting a Global Community Through Multicultural Children's Literature: by Stanley F. Steiner (Paperback – 15 March 2001)
 Dutch Contributions to the Ninth International Congress of Slavists Kiev, 6–14 September 1983 Literature: Literature (Studies in Slavic Literature and … in Slavic Literature and Poetics, V. 2) by Ukraine International Congress of Slavists 1983 (Kiev, A. G. F. Van Holk, and A. G. F. Van Holk (Paperback – Jan 1983)
 Literary Politics in the Soviet Ukraine, 19171934. Rev. ed. (Studies of the Harriman Institute) by George Luckyj (Paperback – 1990)
 Christianity and the Eastern Slavs, Vol. III: Russian Literature in Modern Times. (California Slavic Studies) by Boris Gasparov, Robert P. Hughes, Irina Paperno, and Olga Raevsky-Hughes (Hardcover – 4 January 1996)
 Perspectives On Modern Central and East European Literature: Quests for Identity: Selected Papers from the Fifth World Congress of Central and East European … Central and East European Studies Series) by Todd Patrick Armstrong (Hardcover – 7 April 2001)
 Ukraine: State and Nation Building (Routledge Studies of Societies in Transition, 9) by Taras Kuzio (Library Binding – 29 May 1998)
 Cold War Literature: Writing the Global Conflict (Routledge Studies in Twentieth-Century Literature) by Andrew Hammond (Hardcover – 10 November 2005)
 Rebounding Identities: The Politics of Identity in Russia and Ukraine (Woodrow Wilson Center Press) by Dominique Arel and Blair A. Ruble (Hardcover – 29 November 2006)
 Ukraine At A Crossroads (Interdisciplinary Studies on Central and Eastern Europe, V. 1) by Nicolas Hayoz and Andrej N. Lushnycky (Paperback – 8 March 2005)
 Down Singing Centuries: Folk Literature of the Ukraine by Louisa and LIVESAY, Dorothy (editors). LOEB (Hardcover – 1 January 1981)
 Harvard Ukrainian studies / Ukrainian Research Institute (104: SLA TS 305/ Bungehuis)
 Contested Tongues: Language Politics and Cultural Correction in Ukraine by Laada Bilaniuk (Paperback – 5 January 2006)
 Burden of Dreams: History and Identity in Post-Soviet Ukraine by Catherine Wanner (Paperback – 1 October 1998)
 The Power of Delight: A Lifetime in Literature: Essays 1962–2002 by John Bayley and Leo Carey (Hardcover – 28 March 2005)
 Miracles & monasteries of SeventeenthCentury Ukraine: 10 (Harvard Library of Early Ukrainian Literature in English Translation) by P Lewin (Hardcover – 26 September 2007) – Import
 Beyond Postmodernism: Reassessments in Literature, Theory, and Culture by Klaus Stierstorfer (Hardcover – Sep 2003)
 Letters from Heaven: Popular Religion in Russia and Ukraine by John-Paul Himka and Andriy Zayarnyuk (Hardcover – 30 December 2006)
 The Cambridge Bibliography of English Literature: Volume 4, 1800–1900 (The Cambridge Bibliography of English Literature 3) by Joanne Shattock (Hardcover – 28 March 2000)
 Ukraine, Russia and other Slavic countries in English literature;: A selected bibliography of books, pamphlets, articles, etc., published in English between 1912 and 1936 (Slavistica) by V. J. Kaye-Kysilevs'kyj (Unknown Binding – 1961)
 Holocaust Literature: An Encyclopedia of Writers and Their Work by S. Lillian Kremer (Hardcover – Oct 2002)
 The Reconstruction of Nations: Poland, Ukraine, Lithuania, Belarus, 1569–1999 by Mr. Timothy Snyder (Hardcover – 11 January 2003)
 The American Historical Association's Guide to Historical Literature by Mary Beth Norton and Pamela Gerardi (Hardcover – April 1995)
 State and Institution Building in the Ukraine by Taras Kuzio, Robert S. Kravchuk, and Paul D'Anieri (Hardcover – 20 August 1999)
 The harvest of sorrow: Soviet collectivization and the terror-famine / by Robert Conquest George Robert Acworth Conquest (1917–) (172: OEI 118:112/ P.C. Hoofthuis-Spuistraat 134, 1e verdieping)
 Unpublished and forgotten writings: Political and intellectual trends of the nineteenth century modern Ukrainian literature (Sources of modern history of the Ukraine) by Volodymyr Mijakovskyj (Unknown Binding – 1984)
 The Ukrainian Diaspora (Global Diasporas) by Vic Satzewich (Hardcover – 14 January 2003)
 Nikolai Gogol: Between Ukrainian and Russian Nationalism by Edyta M. Bojanowska (Hardcover – 28 February 2007)
 Rote Zahlen / O. Butsenko. In: Zeitschrift für Kulturaustausch. 55(2005)1(12–13)
 Nach dem Revolution fordern ukrainische Kulturschaffende nun die Reform des Kulturbetriebs und das Ende der ineffizienten kommunistischen Strukturen.
 Anamorphosic Texts and Reconfigured Visions: Improvised Traditions in Contemporary Ukrainian and Irish Literature (Soviet and Post-Soviet Politics and Society 62) by Maryna Romanets and Andreas Umland (Paperback – 2 October 2007)
 The Ukrainian Diaspora (Global Diasporas) by Vic Satzewich (Hardcover – 14 January 2003)
 Towards an Intellectual History of Ukraine: An Anthology of Ukrainian Thought from 1710 to 1995. (Review): An article from: The Modern Language Review by David Saunders (Digital – 28 July 2005)
 The Cultural Renaissance in Ukraine: Polemical Pamphlets 1925–26 by Mykola Khvylovy, Myroslav Shkandrij, and George S.N. Luckyj (Hardcover – Nov 1986)
 Memorandum To The Government Of The United States On The Recognition Of The Ukrainian People's Republic (1920) by Friends Of Ukraine (Hardcover – 20 March 2009)
 Ukraine at the Crossroads: Economic Reforms in International Perspective by Axel Siedenberg and Lutz Hoffmann (Paperback – 14 May 1999) – Illustrated
 Re-Thinking Europe: Literature and (Trans)National Identity. (Textxet Studies in Comparative Literature) by Nele Bemong, Mirjam Truwant, and Pieter Vermeulen (Paperback – 18 January 2008)
 Russian and Ukrainian Avant-Garde and Constructivist Books and Serials in the New York Public Library: A First Census & Listing of Artists Represented by Robert H. Davis and Margaret Sandler (Hardcover – Mar 1998)
 Ukrainian Futurism, 1914–1930: A Historical and Critical Study (Harvard Series in Ukrainian Studies) by Oleh S. Ilnytzkyj (Paperback – 15 January 1998)
 Ancient Ukraine: Mysteries of the Trypilian Culture by Krzysztof Ciuk (Paperback – 1 November 2008)
 Religion and Culture in Early Modern Russia and Ukraine by Samuel H. Baron and Nancy Shields Kollmann (Hardcover – Feb 1997)
 The History of Ukraine (The Greenwood Histories of the Modern Nations) by Paul Kubicek (Hardcover – 30 September 2008)
 Spirit of Ukraine: Ukrainian contributions to world's culture by Dmytro  Snowyd (Unknown Binding – 1935)
 Culture and Technology in the New Europe: Civic Discourse in Transformation in Post-Communist Nations (Civic Discourse for the Third Millennium) by Laura Lengel (Paperback – 3 May 2000)
 Ukrainian futurism: a historical and critical study. Ilnytzkyj, Oleh Stepan / Distributed by Harvard University Press for the Ukrainian Research Institute, Harvard University / 1997 (UBM: H 99-4800/  Singel-425)
 Toward a history of Ukrainian literature. Grabowicz, George G. / distrib. by Harvard University Press for the Harvard Ukrainian Research Institute / 1981 (104: SLA U 50 : 50s Bungehuis-Spuistraat 210, 2e etage)
 Istorija ukrajins'koji literatury. Hrusevs'kyj, Mychajlo / Institut literatury im. T. H. Sevcenka nacional'noji Akademiji nauk Ukrajiny / 1995 (UBM: P 34-8820/ Singel 425)
 A history of Ukrainian literature, from the 11th to the end of the 19th century. Cyzevs'kyj, Dmytro / Ukrainian Academic Press / 1975 (UBM: H 77–63, Singel 425, UB magazijn)
 Ukrainian literature in English: books and pamphlets, 1890–1965: an annotated bibliography Tarnavs´ka, Marta / Canadian Institute of Ukrainian Studies, University of Alberta / 1988 (UBM: Informatiecentr: 891.79, Singel 425)
 A history of Ukrainian literature: from the 11th to the end of the 19th century. Cyzevs'kyj, Dmytro / 2nd ed. / Ukrainian Academy of Arts and Sciences etc. / 1997 (104: SLA U 50 : 47; Bungehuis)
 Ukrainian literature in English: articles in journals and collections, 1840–1965: an annotated bibliography. Tarnavs´ka, Marta / Canadian Institute of Ukrainian Studies, University of Alberta / 1992 (UBM: Informatiecentrum: 891.79)
 Contemporary Ukrainian literature and national identity. Onyshkevych, Larissa M.L.Z. / American Association of Teachers of Slavic and East European Languages (AATSEEL) / 2006 (104: SLA TS 75 2006 050.3- Bungehuis)
 Ukrainian literature. Kasinec, Edward / Harvard University / 1977 (UBM: Br. f\0 L m 9)
 Taras Shevchenko and West European literature. Bojko, Jurij / Association of Ukrainians in Great Britain / 1956 (104: SLA U 75 : SE 23/ Bungehuis of UBM: Br. 3535-15 UB Magazijn)
 Ukrainian literature in the twentieth century: a reader's guide. Luckyj, George S.N. / Univ. of Toronto press / 1992 (UBM: H 96-1818)
 Hryhorij Savyc Skovoroda: an anthology of critical articles. Marshall, Richard H. / Canadian Institute of Ukrainian Studies / 1994 (UBM: H 97–306)
 Ukrainian futurism, 1914–1930: history, theory, and practice. Ilnytzkyj, Oleh Stepan / S.l. / 1983 (104: SLA U 85 : FUT 10 Bungehuis)
 Texts in Ukrainian. Rudnyc'kyj, Jaroslav Bohdan / Winnipeg / 1963 (UBM: X 5320 : 3)
 18.51 Oekraïense taal – en/of letterkunde
 Alexander A. Potebnja's psycholinguistic theory of literature: a metacritical inquiry. Fizer, John / Harvard University Press for the Harvard Ukrainian Research Institute / 1987 (UBM: H 89-2860)
 Monk Chrabr on Slavic writings: the oldest Cyrillic version of 1348. Chrabr / Repr. / Univ. of Manitoba Press / 1964 (104: SLA L 200 K : 30)
 Ukrajins'kyj literaturnyj avanhard: posuky, styl'ovi naprjamky. Bila, Anna / ->Vyd-. 2-->e, dopovnene i pereroblene- / Smoloskyp / 2006 (UBM: HK 07-183)
 Usi ukrajins'ki pys'mennyky. Chizova, Ju.I. / PP "Torsinh pljus" / 2006 (104: SLA U 12 : 36/ Bungehuis)
 ...Z poroha smerti : pys'mennyky Ukrajiny, zertvy stalins'kych represij.  Musijenko, OleksaH. / Rad. pys'mennyk / 1991 UBM: HK 99–809
 Tvory. Stefanyk, Vasyl' / Kyjiv / 1971 (UBM: PK 70–448)
 Vasyl' Stefanyk u krytyci ta spogadach : statti, vyslovljuvannja, memuary. Pohrebennyk, F.P. / Kyjiv / 1969 (UBM: P 70–5011)
 Ukrainian Literature in English, 1980–1989 by Marta Tarnawsky

External links 
 A history of Ukrainian literature by Dmytro Čyževs'kyj
 Modern Ukrainian Literature
 Electronic Library of Ukrainian Literature – established under the auspices of the Institute of Encyclopedic Research, National Academy of Sciences of Ukraine
 An Anthology of Modern Ukrainian Drama (CIUS, 2012), Ed. Larissa M.L. Zaleska Onyshkevych
 Danylo Husar Struk.  Literature at the Encyclopedia of Ukraine
 Existentialism in Modern Ukrainian Drama by Larissa M. L. Zaleska Onyshkevych (Ann Arbor, U. microfilms, 1973)
 Slavic Literature Resources from the Slavic Reference Service, University of Illinois, Urbana-Champaign
 "Tradition and Innovation in Twentieth-Century Ukrainian Verse Drama" by Larissa M. L. Zaleska Onyshkevych, In Creating a Modern Ukrainian Cultural Space, Ed. Myroslav Shkandrij, CIUS, 2000, 139-157.
 "The Problem of the Definitive Literary Text and Political Censorship" [in Mykola Kulish's plays] by Larissa M. L. Zaleska Onyshkevych, Perspectives on Modern Central and East European Literature: Quests for Identity. Ed. Todd Patrick Armstrong. Palgrave, 2001, 25-37.
 Ukrainian Latin literature
 Ukrainian literature at The Columbia Encyclopedia
 Ukrainian literature – written by the Editors of Encyclopædia Britannica
 Ukrainian Writing in Canada in The Canadian Encyclopedia
 Ukrainian literature at The YIVO Encyclopedia of Jews in Eastern Europe
 Ukrainka, Lesia at The Columbia Encyclopedia
 Pavlo Tychyna by Michael M. Naydan
 Avant-garde
 Ukrainian Romanticism: Historical and Cultural Survey by Svitlana Kobets
 Mariana Pytuliak. The Peculiarities of the Gothic Prose Genre in Ukrainian and English Literature: Formation and Development
 Shevchenko Institute of Literature
 

Ukrainian studies
Literature by language